A histochemical tracer is a compound used to reveal the location of cells and track neuronal projections.  A neuronal tracer may be retrograde, anterograde, or work in both directions. A retrograde tracer is taken up in the terminal of the neuron and transported to the cell body, whereas an anterograde tracer moves away from the cell body of the neuron.

List 
 Diamidino yellow
 Fast blue
 Horseradish peroxidase - retrograde
 Cholera toxin B - retrograde
 Pseudorabies virus
 Hydroxystilbamidine - retrograde
 Texas Red
 Fluorescein isothiocyanate

Footnotes

References
 Kreier Felix; Kap Yolanda S; Mettenleiter Thomas C; van Heijningen Caroline; van der Vliet Jan; Kalsbeek Andries; Sauerwein Hans P; Fliers Eric; Romijn Johannes A; Buijs Ruud M (2006). "Tracing from fat tissue, liver, and pancreas: a neuroanatomical framework for the role of the brain in type 2 diabetes", Endocrinology, 147(3):1140-7.

Histology